Petra Jaya National Secondary School is a public secondary school in Kuching, the capital of the East Malaysian state of Sarawak. As of 2015, the school has approximately 106 academic staffs and approximately 18 non-academic staffs. This school holds students from Peralihan to Form 6.

Facilities
In addition to standard facilities, the school provides a library, laboratories for chemistry, physics, biology, and computer rooms. Sports facilities consist of basketball courts, a futsal court, a tennis court, a football field and a hall.

References

National secondary schools in Malaysia
Secondary schools in Sarawak
Buildings and structures in Kuching